Bayandelger is the name of two sums (districts) in Mongolia:
 Bayandelger, Sükhbaatar
 Bayandelger, Töv